Hingna is a town, tehsil and taluka in Nagpur district  in Maharashtra state. Now Hingna is part of Nagpur Metropolitan Region and emerging as an industrial suburb of Nagpur city due to presence of various industrial developments. The Nagpur revenue division is part of Berar region in the state.

Town 
Hingna is an industrial suburb of Nagpur city with industries operating from Maharashtra Industrial Development Corporation areas.

Hingna is located  distance from its District Main City Nagpur. It is located  distance from its State Main City Mumbai. The main river of the town is the Vena nadi (river).

Taluka 
Hingna is main town for the Hingna Taluka.

Other villages in Hingna Taluka are Adegaon, Amgaon(D), Chicholi(P), Dabha, Maharashtra, Degma (Bu), Degma (Kh), Dewli (A), Dewli (Kal), Dewli (P), Dhanoli (G), Dhanoli (K), Takalghat, Turakmari.

References 

Cities and towns in Nagpur district
Talukas in Maharashtra